De Forest is a lunar impact crater on the far side of the Moon. It is located in the far southern hemisphere, to the west of the large walled plain Zeeman and due south of the crater Numerov. Because of its proximity to the southern pole, this crater receives sunlight at an oblique angle when it is on the illuminated half of the Moon.

This is a relatively young formation with features that have not been significantly worn by impacts. The rim is sharp-edged and circular, but somewhat irregular with a small outer rampart. The wide inner wall has multiple terraces, and sections near the rim give the appearance of slumping. At the midpoint of the irregular floor is a relatively large, angular central peak.

Satellite craters 

By convention these features are identified on lunar maps by placing the letter on the side of the crater midpoint that is closest to De Forest.

References 

 
 
 
 
 
 
 
 
 
 
 
 

Impact craters on the Moon